The Apple Bed is the sixth solo album by English singer-songwriter Nick Heyward. It was released in 1997 through Creation Records and produced three singles, "Today", "The Man You Used to Be" and "Stars in Her Eyes".

Track listing

Personnel 
Credits are adapted from the album's liner notes.

 Nick Heyward – Composer, vocals, acoustic guitar, bass guitar
 Anthony Clark – Organ, piano
 Zu Edmonds – Bağlama
 Noel Joyce – Percussion
 Jim Kimberley – Drums
 Michael Newman – Vocal and string arrangements
 Peter Poole – Violin
 Godfrey Salmon – Violin
 Phil Smith – Saxophone
 Phil Taylor – Mellotron
 John Thirkle – Trumpet
 Naomi Zoob – Cello

Production
 Nick Heyward – Record producer
 Ian Shaw – Engineer, mixing, programming
 Chris Sheldon – mixing
 Denis Blackham – Mastering

References

External links 
 
 

1997 albums
Nick Heyward albums
Creation Records albums